Yousif B. Aljamal Jr. (born in Pampanga on June 14, 1983) is a Filipino former professional basketball player who last played for the GlobalPort Batang Pier in the Philippine Basketball Association (PBA). He is also a former NCAA Most Valuable Player for its 82nd season with the San Beda Red Lions.

National Collegiate Athletic Association
Season 82 Finals Most Valuable Player

External links
PBA Online! Player Profile

1983 births
Living people
Barako Bull Energy Boosters players
Basketball players from Pampanga
Filipino men's basketball players
NorthPort Batang Pier players
Meralco Bolts players
San Beda Red Lions basketball players
Power forwards (basketball)
Small forwards
Sta. Lucia Realtors players
TNT Tropang Giga players
Kapampangan people
Barako Bull Energy draft picks